The Middle Congo worm lizard (Monopeltis schoutedeni) is a species of amphisbaenian in the family Amphisbaenidae. The species is indigenous to Central Africa.

Etymology
The specific name, schoutedeni, is in honor of Belgian zoologist Henri Eugene Alphonse Hubert Schouteden.

Geographic range
M. schoutedeni is found in the Democratic Republic of the Congo and Gabon.

Reproduction
The mode of reproduction of M. schoutedeni is unknown.

References

Further reading
de Witte G-F (1933). "Description de deux amphisbaenides nouveaux du Congo Belge". Revue de Zoologie Africain 23 (2): 168–171. (Monopeltis schoutedeni, new species). (in French).
Gans C (2005). "Checklist and Bibliography of the Amphisbaenia of the World". Bulletin of the American Museum of Natural History (289): 1–130. (Monopeltis schoutedeni, p. 37).
Pauwels OSG, Albert J-L, Lenglet GL (2010). "Reptilia, Amphisbaenidae, Monopeltis schoutedeni de Witte, 1933: First record from Gabon, with an updated key to Gabonese worm lizards". Check List 6 (3): 476–478.

Monopeltis
Reptiles of the Democratic Republic of the Congo
Reptiles of Gabon
Reptiles described in 1933
Taxa named by Gaston-François de Witte